The 1856 Michigan gubernatorial election was held on November 4, 1856. Incumbent Republican Kinsley S. Bingham defeated Democratic nominee Alpheus Felch with 56.90% of the vote.

General election

Candidates
Major party candidates
Kinsley S. Bingham, Republican
Alpheus Felch, Democratic

Results

References

1856
Michigan
Gubernatorial
November 1856 events